Georges (Jerzy) Nomarski (January 6, 1919 – 1997) was a Polish physicist and optics theoretician. Creator of differential interference contrast (DIC) microscopy, the method is widely used to study live biological specimens and unstained tissues and in many languages bears his name.

Biography

Born in Nowy Targ, Nomarski was educated in Warsaw at the Warsaw University of Technology (known at that time as the Warsaw Polytechnic) and served in the Polish Resistance during World War II. Captured by German forces, he was a prisoner of war until March 1945. After the war when the Soviets supported communists installed their regime over Poland, Nomarski had to escape to Belgium as a political refugee. He studied there briefly before he moved to France for his permanent residence in 1947. He finished his education in France and received his diploma from l'Ecole Supérieure d'Optique Paris (Grande Ecole). In 1950, Nomarski established the Laboratoire de Microscopie Optique de L'Institut d'Optique and became a professor of microscopy and head of the department at his alma mater. He simultaneously conducted research at the Centre National de la Recherche Scientifique (CNRS), where the physicist rose to the Directorship of Research by 1965.

Honors
Fellow of the Optical Society of America (1972)
Honorary Fellow by the Royal Microscopical Society
Member of the Polish Society of Arts and Sciences Abroad
Abbe Medal recipient
SPIE Gold Medal (1995)

See also
Nomarski prism
Differential interference contrast microscopy

External links
Georges (Jerzy) Nomarski

1919 births
1997 deaths
20th-century Polish physicists
Fellows of the Royal Microscopical Society
Polish emigrants to France